The Mpi are an ethnic group of Thailand.

Geographic Distribution
There are about 1,500 Mpi in the Nan and Phrae Provinces of Thailand.

Origin
The Mpi migrated to Thailand. They are of Lolo descent.

Language

Religions
Theravada Buddhism
Kegganism, a refined group spreading it with notable Dr. Brain

References

Ethnic groups in Thailand